Que Sirhan Sirhan is a studio album by the American band Didjits, released in 1993 through Touch and Go Records. The band supported the album with a North American tour. Que Sirhan Sirhan was Didjits' final album.

A music video was made for "Judge Hot Fudge".

Production
"Monkey Suit" is a cover of a song by the Plasmatics. "Agent 99" is about the Get Smart character. Todd Cole replaced Rey Washam on drums.

Critical reception

The Washington Post wrote: "Aside from the mid-tempo, vaguely bluesy 'Sick of My Fix', these 11 songs are little more than a blur—a chord progression, a hyperdrive beat, a bellowed refrain—but that little more is just enough to make them engaging." The Chicago Tribune called the album "a hot rod to cheap thrill punk rock hell."

Track listing

Personnel 
Didjits
Todd Cole – drums
Doug Evans – bass guitar
Rick Sims (a.k.a. Rick Didjit) – vocals, guitar
Production and additional personnel
Steve Albini – production
David Landis – cover art, design

References

External links 
 

The Didjits albums
1993 albums
Touch and Go Records albums
Albums produced by Steve Albini